Watsonville is a rural town and locality in the Shire of Mareeba, Queensland, Australia. In the  Watsonville had a population of 191 people.

Geography
From further west it can be accessed from the Burke Developmental Road at Petford.

The locality is bounded to the east and south by the Great Dividing Range with a number of named peaks within the locality:

 Cave Hill 
 Lion Mountain 
 Mount Empress 
 Rocky Bluff 
 Specimen Hill 
 Wallum 
 Western Hill

History

Watsonville is a former mining town. The town was named after Robert H. Watson, a tin prospector, who discovered a local deposit on 19 February 1881. The town was surveyed by William J. White on 9 March 1882.

Watsonville State School opened circa 1882 and closed circa 1943. It was located on the block surrounded by Ann, Mary, Ethel and Edith Streets.

Although historically and currently Watsonville is with the Shire of Mareeba, between 2008 and 2013 Watsonville (and all other parts of the Shire of Mareeba) was within the Tablelands Region, an unpopular decision that was reversed in 2014.

At the  Watsonville recorded a population of 344.

In the  Watsonville had a population of 191 people.

Heritage listings

Watsonville has a number of heritage-listed sites, including:
  north-west of Watsonville: Rocky Bluff Battery and Township

Education 
There are no schools in Watsonville. The nearest government primary schools are Herberton State School in neighbouring Moomin to the south-east, Atherton State School in neighbouring Atherton to the north-east, and Irvinebank State School in Irvinebank to the south-west. The nearest government secondary schools are Herbert State School (to Year 10) in Herberton to the south-east and Atherton State High School in Atherton. However, for some students, these schools may be too distant in which case distance education and boarding school are options.

Attractions
Watsonville Pioneer Cemetery is on Watsonville Cemetery Access Road to the north-west of the town.

See also
 List of tramways in Queensland

References

External links 

 

Towns in Queensland
Shire of Mareeba
Localities in Queensland